The Tears of Saint Peter or Penitent Saint Peter is a 1580-1589 painting by El Greco, now in the Bowes Museum in Barnard Castle, UK. It shows Peter the Apostle weeping after his betrayal of Jesus.

Variants of the work are in the Museo Soumaya, Oslo, the Museo del Prado, the San Diego Museum of Art and the Toledo Museum of Art.

Bibliography
 ÁLVAREZ LOPERA, José, El Greco, Madrid, Arlanza, 2005, Biblioteca «Descubrir el Arte», (colección «Grandes maestros»). .
 SCHOLZ-HÄNSEL, Michael, El Greco, Colonia, Taschen, 2003. .

External links

https://web.archive.org/web/20100918205747/http://www.artehistoria.jcyl.es/genios/cuadros/6409.htm

Paintings by El Greco
El Greco
1580s paintings